WCOZ (91.7 FM) is a radio station licensed to New Albany, Pennsylvania, United States. The station is currently owned by J.M.J Radio.

References

External links
 

COZ (FM)
Sullivan County, Pennsylvania
Radio stations established in 2009
2009 establishments in Pennsylvania